Martin Fischer and Philipp Oswald were the defending champions but decided not to participate.
Andrei Dăescu and Florin Mergea won the title, defeating Andrey Kuznetsov and Jose Rubin Statham 7–6(7–4), 7–6(7–1) in the final.

Seeds

Draw

Draw

References
 Main Draw

Oberstaufen Cup - Doubles
2012 Doubles